The African Journal for the Psychological Study of Social Issues is a peer-reviewed academic journal covering the scientific investigation of psychological and social issues and related phenomena in Africa.

External links 
 

Social psychology journals
Biannual journals
Publications established in 1994
English-language journals